Hermarchus is a genus of very large stick insects within the order Phasmatodea and the tribe of Stephanacridini. Known species occur in New Guinea, Fiji, Australia, Philippines and New Caledonia.

Description and biology
Females are often 200 to 240 mm long (body length), depending on species. The males are winged, while wings are lacking in the larger females. In captivity, they are known to feed upon the leaves of plants such as eucalyptus, guava, bramble and acacia.

Species
The Phasmida Species File lists:
 Hermarchus apollonius (Westwood, 1859)
 Hermarchus differens Redtenbacher, 1908
 Hermarchus insignis (Kaup & Heyden, 1871)
 Hermarchus leytensis Zompro, 1997
 Hermarchus novaebritanniae (Wood-Mason, 1877)
 Hermarchus pythonius (Westwood, 1859) - type species (as Phibalosoma pythonius Westwood)
 Hermarchus trigonus (Thunberg, 1815)
 Hermarchus virga Redtenbacher, 1908

References

 J. Redtenbacher. 1908. In Brunner von Wattenwyl, K. and Redtenbacher, J. Die Insectenfamilie der Phasmiden. Parts (Tribes) 12-14, pp 339–482. Engelmann Verlag, Leipzig. See pages 444-448.
 K. Günther. 1929. Die Phasmoïden der Deutschen Kaiserin Ausgusta-Fluss-Expedition 1912/13. Ein Beitrag zur kenntnis der Phasmoïdenfauna Neuguineas. Mitteilungen aus dem Zoologischen Museum in Berlin, 14 (3/4): 597-746, 7 plates. See pages 686-690.
 O. Zompro. 1997. Hermarchus leytensis n.sp., eine neue Phasmide von den Philippinen. Entomologische Zeitschrift 107(1): 38-40.

External links
 Phasmid Study Group: Hermarchus
 Hermarchus stick insects

Phasmatodea genera
Phasmatodea of Asia